KMRQ (96.7 FM) is a radio station broadcasting an active rock format. Licensed to Riverbank, California, United States, the station serves the Modesto area.  The station is currently owned by iHeartMedia, Inc.  Its studios and transmitter are located separately in Modesto.

History
The station went on the air as KQKK in 1979. Then had several callsign changes over the years KVFX 96.7 The Fox, then finally set on the KMRQ calls. The station had spent the previous 2 ½ years as a Spanish language station branded as "La Preciosa" until the switch to Active Rock on 2008-09-05.

External links

MRQ
Active rock radio stations in the United States
Mass media in Stanislaus County, California
Radio stations established in 1979
1979 establishments in California
IHeartMedia radio stations